MTV Hits  is a British pay television music channel owned by Paramount Networks UK & Australia that launched on 1 May 2001 replacing MTV Extra.
 
MTV Hits began broadcasting in widescreen on 28 March 2012.
 
In 2022, MTV Hits began heavily broadcasting 00s-themed programming, encouraging more linearity between the decade-themed MTV Channels. From 8:00pm on 31 December 2022 until 5:00am on 2 January 2023, the channel will broadcast only 00s songs.

European version

In 2014, MTV Hits Europe began broadcasting. The European version of the channel is registered with broadcasting regulators in Czech Republic.

Programming
Programmes on the MTV Hits schedule as of December 2022.

 Today’s Top Hits
 The Official UK Top 40/20
 Newest Vids & Hot Hits!
 No.1s On This Day: 2000-2009/2010-2020
 Brand New Vid!
 Artist: Official Top 20 - A countdown of a certain artist’s top 20 best selling songs.
 Olly Murs Winter Wonderland Top 20
 Artist: Official Top 10 - A countdown of a certain artist's top 10 best selling songs.
 Leona Lewis' Xmas With The Girls
 All The Jingle Ladies
 Christmas Hits!
 The Anton Du Beke Christmas Show: Top 50
 MTV's Most Played Videos Of '22
 Non-Stop 00s NYE Party
 Every No.1 of the 00s!

Former logos

See also
 MTV UK

References

External links
 MTV Hits
 MTV Hits Playlist
 MTV Hits UK & Ireland - presentation, screenshots

MTV channels
Television channels and stations established in 2001
Music video networks in the United Kingdom
2001 establishments in the United Kingdom
Television channel articles with incorrect naming style